Last of the Summer Wine's fifth series originally aired on BBC1 between 18 September and 30 October 1979. All episodes from this series were written by Roy Clarke and produced and directed by Sydney Lotterby.

The fifth series was something of a departure; it was the first to include multiple two-part episodes and introduced a small number of new characters such as Compo's oft-mentioned but never seen nephew and was also notable for an increase in the more physical comedy for which the programme would become more well-known latterly.

The fifth series was released on DVD in region 2 as a combined box set with series 6 on 5 March 2007.

Outline
The trio in this series consisted of:

List of episodes
Regular series

Christmas Special (1979)

DVD release
The box set for series 5 and 6 was released by Universal Playback in March 2007.

Notes

References

External links
Series 5 at the Internet Movie Database

Last of the Summer Wine series
1979 British television seasons